Our Lady of the Elms School is a private, all-girls independent Catholic college preparatory high school in Akron, Ohio, United States. Our Lady of the Elms School was founded by the Sisters of St. Dominic (now Dominican Sisters of Peace) in 1923.

Ranked as one of the top private schools by Niche.com the Elms is the #1 Catholic High School in Summit County and the #1 All-Girls School in the Cleveland Diocese.

Notable alumni 
 River Butcher - Stand-up comedian

Notes and references

External links
 

High schools in Akron, Ohio
Catholic secondary schools in Ohio
Girls' schools in Ohio
Educational institutions established in 1923
Roman Catholic Diocese of Cleveland
1923 establishments in Ohio